Fred Stillwell Stadium is a baseball venue located in Kennesaw, Georgia, USA.  It is home to the Kennesaw State Owls of the NCAA Division I ASUN Conference.  Stillwell Stadium has been home to the program since its 1984 inception.  Its seating capacity is 1,200 spectators.

The park features seating from bullpen to bullpen and also terrace-style seating beyond the left field fence.  A press box is located behind home plate.  Stillwell is part of the Bobbie Bailey Athletic Complex, which also features a clubhouse and workout facilities.

Kennesaw Mountain is located south of the field and is visible if one looks past home plate from the outfield.

In 1998, the field hosted both the Peach Belt Conference Baseball Tournament and an NCAA Division II regional tournament.

See also
 List of NCAA Division I baseball venues

References

College baseball venues in the United States
Baseball venues in Georgia (U.S. state)
Buildings and structures in Cobb County, Georgia
Kennesaw State Owls baseball